Thomas Glynn Ridley (20 July 1858 – 30 June 1945) was an English first-class cricketer, barrister and clergyman.

The second son of Thomas Ridley, he was born at Cullercoats in July 1858. He was educated at Uppingham School, before going up to Exeter College, Oxford. Though he did not play first-class cricket for Oxford University while studying there, he did feature in one first-class match for the Gentlemen of England against Oxford University at Oxford in 1880. Batting twice in the match, he was dismissed for 32 runs in the Gentlemen of England first-innings by George Robinson, while in their second-innings he was dismissed for a single run by the same bowler. He graduated from Oxford in 1883. A student of Lincoln's Inn, he was called to the bar in 1884. He later took holy orders and became a reverend. He died in South Africa at Sea Point, near Cape Town, in June 1945.

References

External links

1858 births
1945 deaths
People from Cullercoats
Cricketers from Tyne and Wear
People educated at Uppingham School
Alumni of Exeter College, Oxford
English cricketers
Gentlemen of England cricketers
Members of Lincoln's Inn
English barristers
19th-century English Anglican priests
20th-century English Anglican priests